Victoria is a city and commune in Malleco Province of La Araucanía Region, Chile. It is the second most populous city in the Malleco Province, and is the gateway to the area known as Araucanía Andina, with attractions such as the Tolhuaca National Park, the Tolhuaca Hot Springs, Malalcahuello National Reserve, and the communes of Curacautín and Lonquimay. The climate is influenced by the vicinity of the temperate rainforest in Chile.

History 
Victoria was founded in 1881 by Bernardo Muñoz Vargas by order of General Gregorio Urrutia, on a plateau overlooking the Traiguén River valley.

The beginning 
Initially when founded in 1881, the city was very poor: consisting of only a few huts and some trade - mainly for the garrison of the fort. Swiss settle came to Victoria in 1883.

The commander of the fort, Bernardo Muñoz Vargas was responsible for some of the early urban planning. Creating some dumps, open streets, and a wooden bridge crossing the nearby river Traiguén.

The Swiss settlers were followed by Germans in Valdivia, who established a mill and a brewery on the banks of Traiguén; and exploited the extensive virgin forest creating some sawmills.

Demographics
Of these, 23,977 (71.6%) lived in urban areas and 9,524 (28.4%) in rural areas. The population grew by 1.6% (522 persons) between the 1992 and 2002 censuses.

Attractions
Some snowcapped volcanoes of the Andes, such as the Tolhuaca, Lonquimay, Sierra Nevada and the Llaima, can be seen from Victoria, forming an enormous backdrop for the city.

Economy
Its economy is based mainly on agriculture, livestock, dairy and export of agricultural products, forestry, trade and services. Its privileged location in the center of the Province, close to the regional capital, Temuco, permits an expedite connection with the main national routes such as railways and Chile Route 5. It is also located halfway along the bi-oceanic corridor between the Pacific Ocean and Argentina across the Pino Hachado Pass.

Administration
As a commune, Victoria is a third-level administrative division of Chile administered by a municipal council, headed by an alcalde who is directly elected every four years. The 2008-2012 alcalde is Hugo Monsalve Castillo (ILA).

Within the electoral divisions of Chile, Victoria is represented in the Chamber of Deputies by Enrique Estay (UDI) and Fuad Chahín (PDC) as part of the 49th electoral district, together with Curacautín, Lonquimay, Melipeuco, Vilcún, Lautaro, Perquenco and Galvarino. The commune is represented in the Senate by Alberto Espina Otero (RN) and Jaime Quintana Leal (PPD) as part of the 14th senatorial constituency (Araucanía-North).

References

External links
  Municipality of Victoria

Communes of Chile
Geography of Araucanía Region
Populated places in Malleco Province
1881 establishments in Chile